Wezuperbrug is a village in the Netherlands. It is a part of the Coevorden municipality in Drenthe.

It was first mentioned in 1942 Wezeperbrug, and refers to the bridge over the Oranjekanaal near Wezup. The settlement started in the late-19th century after the canal was dug, and was originally called Nieuw-Wezup.

References 

Coevorden
Populated places in Drenthe